Mount Lincoln is the eighth-highest summit of the Rocky Mountains of North America and the U.S. state of Colorado. The prominent  fourteener is the highest summit of the Mosquito Range and the eleventh-highest summit in the contiguous United States. The summit of Mount Lincoln is the highest point in Park County and the entire drainage basin of the Missouri River. The mountain was named in honor of Abraham Lincoln, 16th President of the United States.

Climbing
Mount Lincoln is typically climbed from the Kite Lake Trailhead, at the end of Park County Road 8.  Many climbers attempt to combine the summit of Lincoln with those of Bross and Democrat in one climb.

Access issues
Silver was discovered here in 1874.

Mount Lincoln, along with its neighbors Cameron, Democrat and Bross, are pockmarked with old mines, and much of the land is owned privately by mining companies. (A large mine still operates in nearby Climax.) In the summer of 2005, these landowners denied access to the peaks by hikers and climbers, fearing liability in the case of injury, and citing the particular dangers due to the presence of old mine workings. On August 1, 2006, the town of Alma signed a deal to lease the peaks for a nominal fee, to reduce the potential liability to the owners and free up the peaks for recreational access.  The opening of these peaks excludes the summit of Mount Bross since not all of the landowners have given permission for access to the area.

See also

List of mountain peaks of North America
List of mountain peaks of the United States
List of mountain peaks of Colorado
List of Colorado county high points
List of Colorado fourteeners

References

External links

 
 Mount Lincoln on Distantpeak.com
 Mount Lincoln on Summitpost

Lincoln
Lincoln
Pike National Forest
Lincoln
Lincoln